Baydibek District is a district of Turkistan Region in southern Kazakhstan. The administrative center of the district is the selo of Shayan. Population:

References

Districts of Kazakhstan
Turkistan Region